Raleigh is a census-designated place (CDP) in Levy County, Florida, United States. The population was 373 at the 2010 census.

Geography

Demographics

References

Census-designated places in Levy County, Florida
Census-designated places in Florida